Mivtsa Yonatan (Hebrew for Operation Yonatan) may refer to:
Operation Entebbe, also known as Operation Yonatan, a military operation
Mivtsa Yonatan, the Israeli name of Operation Thunderbolt (film), a 1977 Israeli film based on Operation Entebbe